Angry Harvest is a 1985 West German film directed by Agnieszka Holland. It was nominated for the Academy Award for Best Foreign Language Film.  It is based on a novel written by Hermann Field and Stanislaw Mierzenski while they were imprisoned by the Polish government in the early 1950s. (The circumstances under which the novel were written are documented in Field's autobiographical story, "Trapped in the Cold War: The Ordeal of an American Family".)

It was shot at the Spandau Studios in Berlin.

Plot

In the winter of 1942–43, a Jewish family leaps from a train going through Silesia. They are separated in the woods, and Leon, a local peasant who's now a farmer of some wealth, discovers the woman, Rosa, and hides her in his cellar. Leon's a middle-aged Catholic bachelor, tormented by his sexual drive. He doesn't tell Rosa he's seen signs her husband is alive, and he begs her to love him. Rosa offers herself to Leon if he'll help a local Jew in hiding who needs money. Leon pays, and love between Rosa and him does develop, but then Leon's peasant subservience and his limited empathy lead to tragedy.

Cast
Armin Mueller-Stahl: Leon Wolny
Elisabeth Trissenaar: Rosa Eckart
Wojciech Pszoniak: Cybulowski
Gerd Baltus: Geistlicher
Anita Höfer: Pauline
Hans Beerhenke: Kaspar
Käte Jaenicke: Anna
Isa Haller: Magda
Margit Carstensen: Eugenia
Kurt Raab: Maslanko
Gunter Berger: Walden
Wolf Donner: Dan

See also
 List of submissions to the 58th Academy Awards for Best Foreign Language Film
 List of German submissions for the Academy Award for Best Foreign Language Film

References

External links

1985 films
1985 drama films
German drama films
West German films
1980s German-language films
Films directed by Agnieszka Holland
Holocaust films
Films set in Poland
Films based on Polish novels
Films shot at Spandau Studios
1980s German films